The Suzuki S-Presso is a car produced by Maruti Suzuki, Suzuki's subsidiary in India since 2019. A city car with several crossover-inspired design elements, it slots above the Alto and below the Wagon R in the Indian market. The S-Presso is built on the HEARTECT platform derived from Suzuki's kei cars and uses 40% high tensile steel. It is exported to several emerging markets in Africa, South Asia, Southeast Asia, Latin America and the Middle East.

Markets

Asia

India 
The Maruti S-Presso concept car called "Future S concept" was presented at Auto Expo 2018 in February 2018,  the production model was announced on 30 September 2019. It rivals Renault Kwid and Datsun redi-Go in India. Four grade levels are available; Standard, LXi, VXi and VXi+.

CNG variant was announced in June 2020 and only available across for LXi and VXi grades. AGS automated manual transmission is not available as option.

In July 2022, the updated S-Presso was introduced with new dual VVT with dual injector "K10C Dualjet" engine which is 14–17% more efficient (depending on the transmission option) than the older engine, ESP with hill-hold assist for AGS models, electrically adjustable side mirror for Vxi+ and  Vxi+(O) grades and additional cabin air filter for cleaner air in the cabin. Dual airbags and front seat belts with pretensioner and force limiter also became standard across the range. The CNG variants were also discontinued, but relaunched in October 2022 with new K10C Dualjet engine.

Indonesia 
The S-Presso was launched together with second generation Baleno at the 29th Gaikindo Indonesia International Auto Show on 11 August 2022. The car is positioned as the indirect successor of Karimun Wagon R. It is only available with a single unnamed grade based on the pre-updated Indian market VXI+ grade, however it has additional side body mouldings accessories and dual tone alloy wheels.

The 2023 model year was launched in February at the 30th Indonesia International Motor Show with many improvements, such as new dual-injector K10C Dualjet engine, start-stop system, ESP with hill-hold assist for AGS model, electric adjustable mirror, ISOFIX, 7-inch LCD infotainment system, steering wheel with audio control, wireless smartphone linkage, thicker window seals and adjustable head rests for the second row.

Philippines 
In the Philippines, S-Presso was unveiled on 14 March 2020 together with XL7. Only available with single trim with 5-speed manual transmission, the features for this market is based on the combination of Indian market VXi and VXi+ trims.

A special edition was introduced in July 2022, based on regular S-Presso with additional exterior and interior accessories.

Africa

South Africa 
S-Presso was launched in South Africa in March 2020. Available with three trim levels; GL, GL+ and S-Edition, the latter is based on GL+ with additional visual accessories.

Updated S-Presso was launched in December 2022 with new K10C Dualjet engine, stability control, hill control assist for AGS model, ISOFIX, alloy wheels for GL+ and S-Edition grades, and bigger information system, back up camera and new exterior kit for S-Edition grade.

Nigeria 
As the follow up of the reintroduction of Suzuki brand in Nigeria in 2019, Suzuki's distributor in Africa, CFAO Motors (fr) unveiled S-Presso and other Suzuki cars on 4 June 2021.

Tunisia
The Suzuki S-Presso was announced for Tunisian market in June 2020 and became available in October in the same year. This car is marketed as the cheapest micro SUV in the market.

Latin America

Chile 
In March 2020, Suzuki launched the S-Presso in Chile. Two trim levels are available; the cheaper GLX and more expensive GLX Adventure that equipped with exterior accessories and dual tone 14-inch alloy wheels. Both only available with manual transmission.

Peru 
Suzuki launched S-Presso for Peruvian market in March 2020. Two trims are available; GA and GL. No AGS automated manual transmission available.

Powertrain

Safety 
As of July 2022, the Suzuki S-Presso sold in Southeast Asia and Latin America has not been independently crash-tested by ASEAN NCAP and Latin NCAP respectively.

Global NCAP

India 
The Maruti Suzuki S-Presso sold in India was tested by Global NCAP in 2020 with a driver's airbag, ABS and double front seatbelt reminders, and received a zero star rating for adult protection and two stars (out of a maximum five) for child occupant protection. The front passenger's neck showed unacceptably high risk of serious injury during the frontal offset crash resulting in the loss of all points for the test. High chest compression and an unstable passenger compartment resulted in chest protection being rated poor, which would have limited the result to one star nevertheless. The footwell ruptured during the test. The test car had only a static two-point lap belt in the rear centre seat and did not offer ISOFIX anchorages. Legislative requirements in January 2022 required all Indian cars including the S-Presso to be fitted with two frontal airbags.

The S-Presso sold in India is equipped a driver frontal airbag and ABS brakes. A front passenger airbag, seatbelt pretensioners and ISOFIX child seat anchorages were optional, the first two being made standard in early 2022. Updated versions of the S-Presso offer ESC on variants with a AGS option. The S-Presso does not offer side airbags or tyre-pressure monitoring.

In H2 2022 the S-Presso for India was again crash tested by Global NCAP under its new protocol which now includes side-impact crash tests, but it was rated 1 star for adult occupants and 0 for toddlers.

Africa 
An S-Presso unit made in India but tested by Global NCAP for African markets was awarded 3 stars for adult occupants and 2 stars for child occupants in H1 2022 (similar to Latin NCAP 2013). This version was equipped with two airbags and seatbelt pretensioners as standard. In comparison to the earlier test, neck protection for the front passenger was rated the maximum possible 'good', indicating low risk of serious injury. Dummy readings of chest compression to the driver showed moderate risk of serious injury and the passenger compartment became unstable, resulting in chest protection being rated 'weak', just above the limit to not be capped at one star. Suzuki refused to select child seats for the test but even using the restraints selected by Global NCAP there was excessive head excursion for the three year-old and chest deceleration for both dummies.

The updated S-Presso for Africa has ISOFIX anchorages and optional ESC.

Sales

References

External links 

 

S-Presso
Cars introduced in 2019
2020s cars
City cars
Hatchbacks
Front-wheel-drive vehicles
Global NCAP superminis